Powell High School is a high school in Powell, Wyoming, United States. It is located in northwest Wyoming. The district is bordered by Montana on the north and Yellowstone Park on the west.

The school's mascot is the Panther. It is in the 3A classification for Wyoming sports.

In fall 2008, after a $20 million reconstruction project, mice invaded the high school building and infested its classrooms.

References

External links
 

Public high schools in Wyoming
Schools in Park County, Wyoming
Powell, Wyoming